TEA FM is an East Malaysian Chinese and English language radio station. TEA FM is Sarawak's first Mandarin Chinese and English local private radio station.

The content is described by the owners as 60% Chinese and 40% English, focusing on listeners in the 20-40 age group.

History 
TEA FM is jointly set up by KTS Group and Ancom Berhad subsidiary, Redberry Media Sdn Bhd and broadcasts in Mandarin Chinese and English.
It first broadcast its service in Kuching on 1 August 2015 and Kota Kinabalu on 8 August 2015.
The station was officially launched on 28 November 2015 by the Chief Minister of Sarawak, Adenan Satem.

The station broadcasts from Crown Towers at Jalan Padungan, Kuching.

Frequency

References

External links 
 
 

2015 establishments in Malaysia
Radio stations established in 2015
Radio stations in Malaysia
Chinese-language radio stations in Malaysia